The Laurel School Historic District is a  historic district in Fort Collins, Colorado, United States.  It includes works by Montezuma Fuller and other architects, including Bungalow/craftsman architecture and Late Victorian architecture. This district is a residential area that reflects the features of a middle class farming community that developed in Fort Collins in the late nineteenth and twentieth centuries.

It was listed on the National Register of Historic Places in 1980.  It also has been known as, or includes, the Midtown Historic District, Midtown, and Laurel School.  The listing included 549 contributing buildings.

The district includes six or more works by builder-architect Montezuma Fuller, including the Laurel School.

References

Houses on the National Register of Historic Places in Colorado
Victorian architecture in Colorado
Geography of Larimer County, Colorado
Houses in Larimer County, Colorado
Historic districts on the National Register of Historic Places in Colorado
National Register of Historic Places in Larimer County, Colorado
School buildings on the National Register of Historic Places in Colorado